Cincinat Pavelescu ( – November 30, 1934) was a Romanian poet and playwright.

Born in Bucharest, his parents were the engineer Ion Pavelescu and his wife Paulina (née Bucșan). He attended school in his native city, followed by the law faculty of the University of Bucharest from 1891 to 1895, and received his doctorate in 1897. He began a legal career in 1899. That year, he became its editor-in-chief, and took on the role of co-director in 1893. In 1920, he edited  at Paris. From 1931 to 1934, he directed  magazine. He was the first president of the Romanian Writers' Society, elected in 1908. In 1927, he won the national prize for poetry. He died in Brașov.

Bibliography
Despre agenții diplomatici (doctoral thesis), Bucharest, 1897
Poezii, Bucharest, 1911
Epigrame, Craiova, 1925 (subsequent edition, 1934)
Poezii, Bucharest, 1926
Epigrame, Bucharest, 1966
Versuri. Epigrame. Amintiri. Corespondență, Bucharest, 1972

Notes

1872 births
1934 deaths
Writers from Bucharest
University of Bucharest alumni
Romanian epigrammatists
Lawyers from Bucharest
Romanian poets
Romanian magazine editors